This is a list of the United States Billboard Dance Club Songs number-one hits of 2019.

References

United States Dance Club
2019
number-one dance singles